Possessed is the fourth studio album by English heavy metal band Venom, released in April 1985. It is the band's last studio album to feature guitarist Jeffrey Dunn before his first departure from the band in 1986. At the time of its release, it received mixed reviews, even from critics who had liked Venom's earlier albums; Possessed was thought to be in another league as compared to the band's earlier works, even though much of the material on Possessed was written before the release of its predecessor, At War with Satan. It was the first Venom album recorded outside of Impulse Studios. The song "Possessed" is ranked No. 14 on the Parents Music Resource Center's "Filthy Fifteen", a list of the 15 songs the group found to be most objectionable.

The boy on the cover is the son of the band's drummer, Abaddon. The girl is the niece of producer Keith Nichol.

Track listing

Personnel
Venom
Cronos – vocals, bass
Mantas – guitar
Abaddon – drums

Production
Keith Nichol - producer, engineer
S. Nichols, Mark Ammasmifff - engineers

Charts

References

Venom (band) albums
1985 albums